Léonore Simone Yvonne Perrus (born 22 April 1984) is a French fencer. She competed in the sabre events at the 2004, 2008 and 2012 Summer Olympics.

Honours
Orders
Chevalier of the Ordre national du Mérite: 2014

References

External links
 

1984 births
Living people
French female sabre fencers
Olympic fencers of France
Fencers at the 2004 Summer Olympics
Fencers at the 2008 Summer Olympics
Fencers at the 2012 Summer Olympics
Fencers from Paris
Mediterranean Games silver medalists for France
Mediterranean Games medalists in fencing
Competitors at the 2009 Mediterranean Games
Knights of the Ordre national du Mérite
21st-century French women